The women's 50m backstroke swimming event at the 2006 Asian Games was held on December 4, 2006, at the Hamad Aquatic Centre in Doha, Qatar.

Schedule
All times are Arabia Standard Time (UTC+03:00)

Records

Results

Heats

Final

References

Results

Swimming at the 2006 Asian Games